Allure is the third extended play by South Korean singer Hyomin. It was released on February 20, 2019, by Sublime Artist Agency.

The album name Allure means "look" in French, and "a fascinating and mysterious attraction" in English, it signifies a unique sound of music only Hyomin can express.

Following her digital singles "Mango", represented by yellow, and "U Um U Um", represented by emerald; the album Allure, represented by an intense color of red, will complete the color variations. As of gain chart the album sold 10,500 Copies on Gaon

Release
On August 7, 2018, it was revealed that Hyomin was aiming for a mid-September solo comeback with R&B Pop, working with producers from EXO's Ko Ko Bop, Twice's Dance The Night Away and more.

On September 12, 2018, Hyomin released 1st digital single titled "Mango", followed by a showcase. This release marked her first comeback since leaving MBK Entertainment.

On January 20, 2019, Hyomin released 2nd digital single titled "U Um U Um" ahead of her 3rd solo mini album expected to be released in mid-February.

On February 20, 2019, Hyomin released her third mini album Allure. The album's title track is also called "Allure (입꼬리)".

Track listing

Commercial performance
The album was a commercial success as it peaked at #11 on Gaon weekly chart and at #26 on the monthly chart. As of Hanteo Official Yearly Chart,"Allure" sold +10,500 copies making it one of the best selling Korean female Solo releases in 2019 and Hyomin's second EP to reach this mark.

Allure (Song) charted #1 on the YinYueTai China chart as well as U Um U Um and Mango. Hyomin became the only Korean artist to top the chart with 3 singles from the same album. The singles also charted high on KKBOX Asian Chart and appeared in various countries including Japan, Malaysia, Taiwan.

Charts

Release history

References

2019 EPs
K-pop EPs
Kakao M EPs